XHCI-FM is a radio station on 104.7 FM in Acapulco, Guerrero, Mexico. It is operated by Grupo Radio Visión and carries the Los 40 pop format.

History
XECI-AM 1340 received its concession on September 24, 1958. By 1970, it was owned by Eduardo Morales Díaz de la Vega.

In November 2010, XECI was cleared to move to FM as XHCI-FM 104.7.

Starting January 3, 2022, the four Radiorama stations in Acapulco (XHKOK, XHCI, XHNS, and XHPA) were leased to a new operator, Grupo Radio Visión. XHCI took on the Los 40 format from Radiópolis. Los 40 had previously been in Acapulco on XHACD-FM 92.1.

References

Radio stations in Guerrero
Radio stations established in 1958
1958 establishments in Mexico